The Matta is a river in the Sakha Republic, Russia. It is a left tributary of the Sinyaya.

Course
The river begins in the southern area of the Lena Plateau. It flows roughly northeastwards across Gorny District and there are about 300 lakes in its basin. The town of Berdigestyakh, Gorny District, is located by the river. There is also a reservoir on the river that is named after it.

See also
List of rivers of Russia

References

External links

 Geography - Yakutia Organized
Rivers of the Sakha Republic